Gerold Späth (born 16 October 1939 in Rapperswil) is a Swiss author, poet and writer.

Life and career 
Born 1939 in Rapperswil on the Obersee lakeshore in the canton of St. Gallen in Switzerland, the son of an organ builder made his studies in London and Fribourg, after a training as an export clerk. Later, he worked in his father's company Späth Orgelbau in Rapperswil. Thereafter, Gerold Späth undertook several trips and a longer stay in Ireland. Gerold Späth lives and writes mainly in Rapperswil.

Gerold Späth's three central works are thematically connected: "Unschlecht" (1970), "Balzapf oder als ich auftauchte" (1977) and "Barbarswila" (1988), in which Rapperswil gave model to the fictitious localities Spiessbünzen, Molchgüllen and Barbarswila, the satirical depictions of a typical Swiss small-town. A new narrative form was introduced with Commedia (1980), in a certain way basing on Dante's Inferno, for which Späth was awarded with the German book prize Alfred-Döblin-Preis. Späth's literally cosmos is characterized by love, lust and vices, and a propensity to the blazing sensuality and baroque awareness of the transience of everything earthly. He dominates all the stops by the comical and humorous to the tragic. Tales of Späth's home town of Rapperswil and the region around Zürichsee form a central motif of his work.

The Swiss films Der Landvogt von Greifensee (1979) and Völlerei oder Inselfest (1980) base on Gerold Späth's novels.

Gerold Späth's novels and short stories were translated in various languages, inter alia by Alice Ceresa the Italian-language edition of the novel "Unschlecht" (Italian: L'incredibile storia di Johann il Buono) in 1977.

Gerold Späth's self-image as author is palpable to his organ builder family, as he told on occasion of a dramatic reading: it's important that an organ will still be in 200 years a good organ. This results in a great care in writing, which he ironically called team inability. He wants no lecturer, independence in writing is the most important. Also of great importance to his literary works are the different residences – Rapperswil, Ireland and Italy – life abroad is deteriorating views of Switzerland. Anyway, Switzerland and his childhood in Rapperswil, which Gerold Späth compares with Mark Twain's Tom Sawyer and Huckleberry Finn, as he grew up with the so-called Seebuebedütsch (Zürichsee children language, meaning also 'wild') and to write on the people's mouth. His 'staff' is reduced to four family members, among them his wife Christine Lötscher.

Work

Books (excerpt) 
 1979: Unschlecht. Arche, Zürich 1970, ASIN B002PDE5W4.
 1979: Commedia. Fischer, Berlin 1980, .
 1991: Stilles Gelände am See. Suhrkamp, Berlin 1991, .
 2013: Drei Vögel im Rosenbusch. Eine Erzählung. Lenos, Basel 2013, ASIN B00J7KDOM0.

Poems (excerpt) 
 2005: Hebed Sorg. In: Ufnau – Insel der Stille, Rapperswil 2005.

Filmographie 
 1980: Völlerei oder Inselfest (Todsünde 4) 
 1979: The Bailiff of Greifensee (Der Landvogt von Greifensee)

Awards 
 1970: Award of Conrad Ferdinand Meyer-Stiftung 
 1970: Werkjahr der Stadt Zürich
 1972: Werkjahr Pro Helvetia (as well in 1991 and 1997) 
 1973: Werkjahr Stiftung Schweizerische Landesausstellung 
 1975: Werkjahr Kanton Zürich 
 1977: Anerkennungsgabe der Stadt Zürich (and in 1984) 
 1979: Anerkennungsgabe Kanton St. Gallen 
 1979: Alfred-Döblin-Preis for Commedia
 1980: DAAD-Stipendiat in Berlin
 1980/1981: Istituto Svizzero Roma scholarship 
 1983: Award of Schweizerische Schillerstiftung (and in 1992) 
 1983: Premio stampa internazionale della città di Roma 
 1984: Georg Mackensen-Literaturpreis 
 1987: Hörspielpreis Stiftung "Radio Basel" 
 1990: Preis für Schweizer Theatermacher 
 2001: Ehrengabe der Stadt Zürich 
 2004: Werkbeitrag Pro Helvetia

Literature 
 Charlotte E. Aske: Gerold Späth und die Rapperswiler Texte. Untersuchungen zu Intertextualität und kultureller Identität. Lang, Bern 2002, .
 Klaus Isele, Franz Loquai (Hrsg.): Gerold Späth. Edition Isele, Eggingen 1993, .

References

External links 

 
 Gerold Späth on the website of the Swiss television SRF 

1939 births
Living people
Swiss male poets
People from Rapperswil-Jona
Swiss male novelists
20th-century Swiss poets
20th-century male writers
20th-century Swiss novelists
Swiss poets in German
21st-century Swiss poets
21st-century Swiss novelists
21st-century male writers